This is a list of Princesses of Portugal, since 1388, by marriage.  In 1645, the title was replaced with Princess of Brazil.

See also
List of Portuguese consorts
Princess of Brazil
Princess Royal of Portugal
Princess of Beira

Portugal